Moss Lane (currently known as the J. Davidson Stadium for sponsorship purposes) is a multi-purpose stadium in Altrincham, Greater Manchester, England. It is currently used primarily for football matches and is the home ground of Altrincham. The stadium also hosts games for Manchester United's under 17s side, and women's development team, as well as serving as a backup home venue for Manchester United W.F.C.

The stadium comprises two all-seater stands on one side with a combined capacity of 1,323 spectators and terraces on the other three sides, giving a total capacity of 7,873.

Chorley Borough RLFC moved to Moss Lane for the 1989–90 season and renamed themselves Trafford Borough RLFC. Trafford Borough played at Moss Lane for three seasons before moving to Blackpool as Blackpool Gladiators RLFC for the 1992–93 season.

References

Football venues in England
Multi-purpose stadiums in the United Kingdom
Altrincham F.C.
Manchester United F.C.
Altrincham
Defunct rugby league venues in England
Sports venues completed in 1910